St Augustine the Less was a Church of England parish church in Bristol, England, first attested in 1240, rebuilt in 1480, damaged in 1940 by fire, and demolished in 1962. It took its name from its proximity to the church of the Abbey of St Augustine (St Augustine the Great), which is now Bristol Cathedral.

The parish was united with that of St George's Church, Brandon Hill, after the Second World War. After demolition the site remained vacant until the early 1980s, when an archaeological investigation was undertaken before an extension to the Royal Hotel was built over it; over 100 burial vaults were discovered below the former church's floor, together with coins of various periods; the finds were deposited in the Bristol City Museum and Art Gallery.

Archives
Parish records of St Augustine-the-Less church, Bristol are held at Bristol Archives (Ref. P.St Aug)  (online catalogue) including baptism and marriage registers and one burial register. The archive also includes records of the incumbent from 1235 to 1938, churchwardens, overseers of the poor, charities, schools, societies and vestry plus deeds.

See also
 Churches in Bristol

References

Former churches in Bristol
Former Church of England church buildings
13th-century church buildings in England
Demolished buildings and structures in Bristol
Buildings and structures demolished in 1962